Shehla Masood (1973–2011) was an Indian environmentalist, wildlife and Right to Information activist. She was shot dead on 16 August 2011 in front of her house in Bhopal while she was sitting in her car, by three persons who were hired by a local female interior designer. Crime Patrol Dial 100 aired episode 735 based on the case.

Social activist
Masood was an activist working primarily on wildlife conservation, and also supported other causes like good governance, RTI Act, Police reforms, environment, women's rights & issues and transparency. She sat on a fast in support of Anna Hazare's India Against Corruption campaign. She was actively involved in raising issues related to the deaths of tigers in the various sanctuaries of Madhya Pradesh. Shehla herself was working for the Shyama Prasad Mukherjee Trust, organising events for them from Srinagar to Kolkata to Delhi. She had asked for details about Narmada Samagraha, an NGO backed by the BJP Rajya Sabha MP. She was about to leave for Boat Club in Bhopal to join the anti-government protest to bring the Jan Lokpal Bill when she was killed. She co-founded RTI Anonymous, a service for whistle blowers for filing anonymous Right to Information (RTI) Applications with Indian Government departments without getting victimised, with her friends just a few days before her death. Shehla Masood was posthumously awarded the award for her relentless effort under the category, 'Crusade Against Corruption'.

Professional life
She was the secretary of NGO Udai and was the CEO of a company called 'Miracles' which was involved in "Events and Media related services", according to her public Linked profile. NGO Udai was created in 2004, it recently ventured into tiger and forest conservation.

Assassination
Masood was constantly living under threat, as revealed by her in an interview before she was shot dead.

On 16 August 2011 at around 11:19 AM, she was shot by an unidentified assailant from point blank range. Masood was about to leave in her car when she was shot in the driver's seat.

According to Police, the motive of the killing remains unknown. However, as per media, the possible cause could be her RTI activities and for protesting illegal diamond mining done by Rio Tinto in connivance with government officers and fighting to save tigers, leopards and forests, who were killed for their skins in connivance with forest officers

In an indication of the seriousness of this high-profile murder, for which no arrests were made in the initial days, the Government of Madhya Pradesh transferred the case to the Central Bureau of Investigation. The CBI called a forensic team headed by Professor T D Dogra and Rajinder Singh, Director CFSL Delhi.
On 28 February 2012 Central Bureau of Investigation claims to have cracked the case and arrested a Bhopal-based interior designer Mrs Zahida Parvez and three accomplices who were hired to kill Masood. The interior designer's employee and friend who presumably had information about the murder plan was arrested on 2 March 2012. The interior designer had given the contract to Bhopal-based criminal Saqib 'Danger', known for his connections with the local BJP party in Madhya Pradesh, who further contracted it to Tabish (his cousin) based in Kanpur. The vehicle used in the getaway has been found.

One of the accused arrested named Irfan had said that he did not shoot Masood but his colleague Shanu did. However, further investigation revealed when cousin of Bhopal builder Saqib 'Danger' Tabish was arrested that Shanu did not shoot Masood it was Irfan who did. Zahida and Irfan have recorded their statements in front of the CBI Magistrate. Meanwhile, the murder weapon has been found and has been sent for forensic testing.
The motive behind the murder as pointed by the CBI is Zahida was obsessed and very close with a Bhopal BJP [MLA Dhruv Narayan Singh], Zahida was very disturbed with the closeness of Shehla Masood and BJP MLA. . Zahida decided to eliminate Masood. Some of the diary contents recovered by the CBI from Zahida's office reveal this motive. Nothing in support of the assumption has been found. Polygraph tests are being conducted on few accused and the MLA however results are yet to be known. Later CBI gives clean chit to BJP MLA Dhruv Narayan Singh due to lack of evidence against him.

Trial 
On 28 January 2017, CBI court in Bhopal convicted four people for murder and criminal conspiracy for the murder of Masood. Another accused was pardoned because he turned approver.

Awards 
Masood was posthumously awarded with the SR Jindal “Crusade Against Corruption”

See also
 Attacks on RTI Activist in India

References

External links
Anna Supporter and RTI activist Shehla Masood shot dead in Bhopal
What really happened to Shehla Masood?

Social workers
Assassinated Indian people
People murdered in India
2011 deaths
Writers from Bhopal
Deaths by firearm in India
Indian environmentalists
1973 births
Indian whistleblowers
Environmental killings
Women writers from Madhya Pradesh
20th-century Indian women writers
20th-century Indian educators
Indian women environmentalists
Activists from Madhya Pradesh
Indian women activists
20th-century Indian non-fiction writers
Social workers from Madhya Pradesh
Women educators from Madhya Pradesh
Educators from Madhya Pradesh
20th-century women educators